Hockey at the Asian Games may refer to
 Field hockey at the Asian Games
 Ice hockey at the Asian Winter Games